Banyan Productions is a production company located in Philadelphia, Pennsylvania, United States. Clients include Discovery Channel, the Food Network, Fox, HGTV, Lifetime, NBC, Nickelodeon/Nick at Nite, TLC, and the Travel Channel.  Banyan Productions was founded in 1992 by Susan Cohen-Dickler, Jan Dickler and Ray Murray, the former host of Evening Magazine on KYW-TV 3 in Philadelphia.

TV shows
 A Dating Story (2000-2004)
 A Makeover Story (2000-2003)
 Ambush Makeover (2004)
 A Wedding Story (1997-2004)
 A Baby Story (1999-2000)
 Adoption Stories (2002)
 Birth Day (2000-2003)
 Deliver Me (2008)
 Design Invasion (2004)
 Design Basics (2001)
 Discover Magazine (TV series) (1996)
 Epicurious (1998-2003)
 Furniture to Go (1994-1996)
 48 Hour Wedding (2001)
 Gimme Shelter (1998)
 Guys Rooms (2002)
 Hi-Jinks (2005)
 Home Matters (1993)
 Nice Package (2004)
 On the Inside (1997)
 Perfect Proposal (2003-2005)
 Renovations (2000)
The Reunion 1998 [TV series] first Docuseries Lynda Rose/Jennifer Paige reunion
 Surviving Motherhood (2006)
 Trading Spaces (2001-2007)
 Trading Spaces: Boys vs. Girls (2003)
 Trading Spaces: Home Free (2004)
 Travelers (1996-1998)
 The Princess Girl Diaries (2003)
 Voices of Scotland (1997)
 Walking with Dinosaurs (2003)

External links
 Banyan Productions

Television production companies of the United States
Companies based in Philadelphia